Gobius hypselosoma is a species of goby native to fresh and brackish waters of Madagascar and the Mascarene Islands.  It can reach a length of  TL.

References

hypselosoma
Fish of Madagascar
Tropical fish
Taxonomy articles created by Polbot
Fish described in 1867